The First EAFF Women's Football Championship was a football competition held from August 1 to August 6, 2005 in South Korea. South Korea won the first edition by beating its opponents to finish first, DPR Korea finished second.

Matches and Results 

1 goals

 Jo Yun-mi
 Ri Un-suk
 Han Jin-sook
 Park Eun-jung
 Park Eun-sun

Personal Awards
Best Goalkeeper Award :  Kim Jung-mi
Best Defender Award :  Yoo Young-sil
Fair play Team : 
MVP :  Ho Sun-hui

External links
East Asian Football Championship 2005 Final Competition in South Korea

Women's Football Championship, 2005
2005
2005
EAFF Women's Football Championship, 2005
2005 in women's association football